Unity is a 2015 documentary film written, directed and produced by Shaun Monson, and the sequel to the 2005 film Earthlings. The film is narrated by one hundred actors, artists, athletes, authors, businessmen, entertainers, filmmakers, military personnel and musicians. The film was released worldwide on August 12, 2015.

Premise

Unity is a documentary that explores humanity's transformation, presented in five chapters: "Cosmic", "Mind", "Body", "Heart" and "Soul".

Narrators

 Casey Affleck
 Dianna Agron
 Malin Åkerman
 Rick Allen
 Pamela Anderson
 Jennifer Aniston
 Michael Beckwith
 Kristen Bell
 Eve Best
 Fan Bingbing
 Brandon Boyd
 Ellen Burstyn
 Rose Byrne
 Jesse Carmichael
 Jessica Chastain
 Deepak Chopra
 Gregory Colbert
 Common
 David Copperfield
 Marion Cotillard
 Portia de Rossi
 Ellen DeGeneres
 John Paul DeJoria
 David DeLuise
 Emily Deschanel
 Phil Donahue
 Dr. Dre
 Minnie Driver
 Alison Eastwood
 Joel Edgerton
 Claire Forlani
 Arian Foster
 Jorja Fox
 Kathy Freston
 Michael Gambon
 Balthazar Getty
 Jeff Goldblum
 Selena Gomez
 Caroline Goodall
 Maggie Grace
 Adrian Grenier
 Marcia Gay Harden
 Beth Hart
 Rutger Hauer
 Tony Hawk
 Lena Headey
 Mariel Hemingway
 Tom Hiddleston
 Missy Higgins
 Anjelica Huston
 Famke Janssen
 January Jones
 Tony Kanal
 Ben Kingsley
 David LaChapelle
 Cloris Leachman
 Adam Levine
 Isabel Lucas
 Damien Mander
 Arlene Martel
 Tim McIlrath
 Leighton Meester
 Helen Mirren
 Moby
 Matthew Modine
 Carrie-Anne Moss
 Jason Mraz
 Olivia Munn
 Edward James Olmos
 Ryan O'Neal
 Julia Ormond
 Aaron Paul
 Joe Perry
 Joaquin Phoenix
 Freida Pinto
 Maggie Q
 Matthieu Ricard
 Michelle Rodriguez
 Geoffrey Rush
 Zoe Saldana
 Susan Sarandon
 Liev Schreiber
 Nestor Serrano
 Amanda Seyfried
 Martin Sheen
 Russell Simmons
 Sam Simon
 Amy Smart
 Kevin Spacey
 Mark Strong
 Catherine Tate
 Larenz Tate
 Jennifer Tilly
 Shaun Toub
 Paul Watson
 Ben Whishaw
 Persia White
 Kristen Wiig
 Olivia Wilde
 Marianne Williamson
 Anton Yelchin

Production
On June 26, 2013, Shaun Monson started a Kickstarter campaign to complete and market the film, with the goal of reaching "a minimum of $800,000 to complete post-production and release the film within a year", but the fundraising was unsuccessful. Funding was instead secured with the help the film's Executive Producers: Dieter Paulmann, Alec Pedersen, and Babak Cyrus Razi. After Monson's first installment, Earthlings (2005), he spent roughly seven years developing, writing and producing Unity.

Release
The film is produced by Monson and Melissa Danis with Nation Earth and was distributed by SpectiCast and Fathom Events.

The film was also recorded as an audiobook read by Monson. The audiobook is an unabridged version of the Unity script and is about five hours long.

See also
 List of vegan media

References

External links
 
 

2015 films
2015 documentary films
American documentary films
Documentary films about spirituality
Crowdfunding projects
2010s English-language films
2010s American films